Jeffrey M. "Jeff" Shaara (born February 21, 1952) is an American novelist and the son of Pulitzer Prize winner Michael Shaara.

Biography
Jeffrey Shaara was born in New Brunswick, New Jersey, and grew up in Tallahassee, Florida. He graduated from Florida State University in 1974 with a degree in Criminology and lives in Gettysburg.

He wrote Gods and Generals and The Last Full Measure, which are the prequel and sequel, respectively, to his father Michael's award-winning novel The Killer Angels. Jeff followed his father's footsteps upon the latter's death, writing historical fiction and documenting the American wars and their most historically relevant characters. In total, Jeff has written fifteen New York Times bestselling novels.

Jeff delivered the commencement speech at University of Delaware's 2005 undergraduate ceremony. Jeff has deemed this "one of the most important moments in his life."

He completed a trilogy in 2010 about World War II in the European and North African theaters. A fourth World War II novel, titled The Final Storm, covers the end of the war in the Pacific, and was released on May 17, 2011.

Awards

Shaara has received the W.Y. Boyd Literary Award for Excellence in Military Fiction from the American Library Association in 2022 for The Eagle's Claw, in 2018 for The Frozen Hours, in 2005 for To The Last Man: A Novel of The First World War, and in 1997 for Gods and Generals. The American Library Association's Reference and Users Services Association recognized The Steel Wave as a 2009 Notable Book.

He has also been awarded The Lincoln Forum's "Richard Nelson Current Award of Achievement", New York Civil War Round Table's "Bell I. Wiley Award", and Florida State University's "Artes Award" as a Distinguished Alumnus. In 2011, Shaara was inducted into the FSU College of Criminology Hall of Fame  and awarded FSU's first annual Distinguished Writer's Award.

Film adaptations

In 2003, Warner Brothers made the major motion picture Gods and Generals, which was based upon his book of the same title.

Works
Jeff Shaara's Civil War Battlefields: Discovering America's Hallowed Ground (2006)

Novels
Gods and Generals (1996)—Civil War (1858–1863) 
The Last Full Measure (1998)—Civil War (1861–1865) 
Gone for Soldiers (2000)—US-Mexican War (1847–1848) 
Rise to Rebellion (2001)—Pre-American Revolutionary War (1770–1776) 
The Glorious Cause (2002)—American Revolutionary War (1776–1783) 
To the Last Man (2004)—World War I (1914–1918) 
The Rising Tide (2006)—World War II (1939–1945), Trilogy Part 1 of 3 
The Steel Wave (2008)—World War II (1939–1945), Trilogy Part 2 of 3 
No Less Than Victory (2009)—World War II (1939–1945), Trilogy Part 3 of 3 
The Final Storm (2011)—World War II (1939–1945), Pacific Theater 
A Blaze of Glory  (2012)—Civil War (1861-1865), Western Theater, Tetralogy Part 1 of 4 
 A Chain of Thunder   (2013)—Civil War (1861-1865), Western Theater, Tetralogy Part 2 of 4 
 The Smoke at Dawn (2014)—Civil War (1861-1865), Western Theater, Tetralogy Part 3 of 4 
 The Fateful Lightning (2015)—Civil War (1861-1865), Western Theater, Tetralogy Part 4 of 4 
 The Frozen Hours (2017)—Korean War (1950-1953) 
 To Wake The Giant (2020)—Pearl Harbor, World War II (1939–1945) 
 The Eagle's Claw (2021) - Battle of Midway, World War II (1939–1945) 
 The Old Lion (2023) - Teddy Roosevelt's life and times, including Amazon exploration

References 

 "Interview with Jeff Shaara", by Gene Santoro, HistoryNet.com, September 2009.
 "Meet Jeff Shaara" official web site
 "Author Jeff Shaara" 3 interviews at BookReporter.com: May 16, 2008; November 10, 2006; October 2004.
 "Interview with Best-Selling Author Jeff Shaara", by Greg Caggiano, January 24, 2011.

External links 
 Author's website
 Interview on The Rising Tide at the Pritzker Military Museum & Library on November 30, 2006
 Video or audio interview by Karen Saupe on Inner Compass
 Video interview on The Steel Wave
 Interview on his father and No Less Than Victory at the Pritzker Military Museum & Library on February 4, 2010

In Depth interview with Shaara, September 7, 2003

20th-century American novelists
21st-century American novelists
American historical novelists
American male novelists
Writers of historical fiction set in the modern age
Novelists from Florida
Florida State University alumni
1952 births
Living people
American writers of Italian descent
Writers from New Brunswick, New Jersey
20th-century American male writers
21st-century American male writers
Novelists from New Jersey
Leon High School alumni